This is a list of all players who have played for the Baltimore Orioles of Major League Baseball. Prior to moving to Baltimore, the franchise was known as the St. Louis Browns.

All-time roster
Names in bold are members of the National Baseball Hall of Fame and Museum.
Names in italics have had their numbers retired by the team.

Note: changing the sort order below may be slow.

References

Major League Baseball all-time rosters
Baltimore Orioles players
Roster